Arctic is a 2018 Icelandic survival drama film directed by Joe Penna and written by Penna and Ryan Morrison. The film is an international co-production between Iceland and the United States, and stars Mads Mikkelsen as a man stranded in the Arctic. The film premiered at the 2018 Cannes Film Festival, and was released in theatres on 1 February 2019.

Plot
Overgård (Mads Mikkelsen) is stranded in the Arctic Circle waiting for rescue, living in his crashed plane. His daily routine consists of checking fishing lines, mapping his surroundings and running a distress beacon powered by a hand-crank dynamo. One day, his supply of fish is raided by a polar bear. A helicopter responds to his beacon and attempts to land, but crashes. The pilot (Tintrinai Thikhasuk) is killed and the passenger (Maria Thelma Smáradóttir), is severely injured and unconscious. Overgård dresses her wound and takes her to his plane. She does not speak English and only proves her alertness by squeezing his hand.

Overgård returns to the wreckage of the downed helicopter and  finds some food, a propane cooking stove, medical equipment, a sled, a map of the area and a photo of the woman, the pilot and their child, which he brings back for her. On the map he locates a seasonal refuge that appears to be a few days' trek away. When the woman's condition does not improve, he decides he must risk the journey to the refuge to seek rescue, by a direct route. He secures the woman to the sledge and drags her behind him. He runs into a steep slope not indicated on the map, climbs it alone and sees a relatively smooth path in front of him, but fails three times in trying to hoist the woman up using ropes. He therefore decides he must take the longer route, around the icy outcrops, aware that this roundabout trek will add at least three days to his sledge-hauling trek. The flat path is exposed to strong headwinds.

When they take refuge one night in a cave, a polar bear is attracted to the scent of cooking fish. He drives the bear off with a distress flare. The next day the woman's condition worsens. Assuming her to be dead or near death, he abandons her to continue his journey alone but leaves her with the photo of her family. Shortly afterwards he falls in a crevasse and is knocked unconscious. He awakens to find himself at the bottom of a cavern with one of his legs trapped under a boulder. He injures it in repeated efforts to tug it free, and finally manages to crawl out of the cavern and back to the surface. Returning to the woman's sled, he finds that she is still alive, weeps in apology, and, despite his injured leg, sets his mind to taking her with him again.

Nearly at the end of his strength, he sees a helicopter in the distance. He lights his remaining flare but does not seem to attract the attention of the two men from the landed helicopter crew. Desperate, he sets on fire his parka, the only thing between him and freezing if the crew miss his signal, and then waves it wildly, but apparently  to no avail. The helicopter takes off and disappears behind a mountain. Exhausted, he lies down next to the woman, takes her hand and prepares to meet his fate. He closes his eyes as the helicopter lands behind them.

Cast
 Mads Mikkelsen as Overgård - Stranded pilot
 Maria Thelma Smáradóttir as Young Woman
 Tintrinai Thikhasuk as Helicopter Pilot

Production
The film was shot over the course of 19 days in Iceland. Mads Mikkelsen referred to the film as the most difficult shoot of his career.

Release
On 12 April 2018, the film was selected to compete for the Camera d'Or at the 2018 Cannes Film Festival. Bleecker Street acquired U.S. and selected international rights out of the Cannes Film Festival.

On February 1 2023, the film was released on Netflix US and quickly reached the top spot for most-watched movies of the week.

Reception
The website's critical consensus reads, "Arctic proves that a good survival thriller doesn't need much in the way of dialogue to get by -- especially when Mads Mikkelsen is the one doing the surviving." On Metacritic, the film has a weighted average score of 71 out of 100, based on 30 critics, indicating "generally favorable reviews".

Nick Allen of RogerEbert.com gave the film 2.5 stars out of 4, saying that the drama "largely subsists on the on-screen muscle of Mads Mikkelsen." Oliver Jones of The New York Observer gave the film 3.5/4 stars, calling it "precise, honest and unrelenting." He added that the film "is one of those singular cinematic experiences ... for which movie theaters still exist." David Ehrlich of Indiewire called it "one of the best movies ever made about a man stranded in the wilderness", adding that "Mads Mikkelsen doesn't need any dialogue to deliver the best performance of his career."

See also

List of Icelandic films

References

External links
 
 

2018 films
2018 thriller drama films
Icelandic drama films
English-language Icelandic films
Films set in the Arctic
2010s survival films
2010s historical films
Films scored by Joseph Trapanese
2018 drama films
2018 directorial debut films
2010s English-language films